Keerthi Chawla is an Indian actress, who is working in Tamil, Telugu , Hindi and Kannada film industry. She has appeared in some well-known films, such as Aadi, Aalwar, Naan Avanillai and Uliyin Osai.

Filmography

References

External links 
 

Indian film actresses
Living people
Actresses in Telugu cinema
Actresses in Tamil cinema
Actresses from Andhra Pradesh
Actresses in Kannada cinema
Actresses in Hindi cinema
20th-century Indian actresses
21st-century Indian actresses
Year of birth missing (living people)